Charles-Borromée Genest (October 4, 1832 – January 14, 1873) was a politician from Quebec, Canada.

Background

He was born on October 4, 1832, in Gentilly, Mauricie.

Political career

He ran as a Conservative candidate in the federal district of Trois-Rivières in 1867 and lost.

Genest won a provincial by-election in the district of Trois-Rivières in 1869.  He lost his bid for re-election in 1871, against another Conservative, Henri-Gédéon Malhiot.

Death

He died on January 14, 1873, in Trois-Rivières.

References

1832 births
1873 deaths
Conservative Party of Quebec MNAs